The Young Girls Turn 25 is a 1993 French documentary film directed by Agnès Varda, about Jacques Demy's 1967 film The Young Girls of Rochefort. It was screened in the Un Certain Regard section at the 1993 Cannes Film Festival.

Cast
 Mag Bodard
 George Chakiris (archive footage)
 Danielle Darrieux (archive footage)
 Jacques Demy (archive footage)
 Catherine Deneuve
 Françoise Dorléac (archive footage)
 Bernard Evein
 Jean-Louis Frot
 Gene Kelly (archive footage)
 Michel Legrand
 Jacques Perrin
 Michel Piccoli (archive footage)
 Jacques Riberolles (archive footage)
 Bertrand Tavernier
 Grover Dale

References

External links

1993 films
1990s French-language films
French documentary films
Films directed by Agnès Varda
1993 documentary films
Documentary films about films
1990s French films